Siegel disc is a connected component in the Fatou set where the dynamics is analytically conjugate to an irrational rotation.

Description

One possible asymptotic behavior for a point  is to be a fixed point, or in general a periodic point. In this last case  where  is the period and  means  is a fixed point.

Siegel discs are one of the possible cases of connected components in the Fatou set (the complementary set of the Julia set), according to Classification of Fatou components, and can occur around irrationally indifferent periodic points. The Fatou set is, roughly, the set of points where the iterates behave similarly to their neighbours (they form a normal family).
conjugate to an irrational rotation of the complex unit disc.

Name
The disk is named in honor of Carl Ludwig Siegel.

Gallery

Formal definition
Let  be a holomorphic endomorphism where  is a Riemann surface, and let U be a connected component of the Fatou set .

Siegel's theorem proves the existence of Siegel discs for irrational numbers satisfying a strong irrationality condition (a Diophantine condition), thus solving an open problem since Fatou conjectured his theorem on the Classification of Fatou components.

Later Alexander D. Brjuno improved this condition on the irrationality, enlarging it to the Brjuno numbers.

This is part of the result from the Classification of Fatou components.

See also
 Douady rabbit
 Herman ring

References

 Siegel disks at Scholarpedia

Fractals
Limit sets
Complex dynamics